Erwin Kostedde (born 21 May 1946) is a German former professional footballer who played as a striker.

Career
The son of a German mother and an African-American father, Kostedde was the first mixed-race player to play for West Germany, and was the top scorer in the Belgian League in 1970–71 and in Ligue 1 in 1979–80. He scored 98 goals in 218 Bundesliga matches.

Kostedde won his first of three caps for West Germany in 1974.

Personal life
In 1990, Kostedde was accused of robbing an amusement hall, and spent six months in prison before being acquitted and receiving DM 3,000 compensation.

In 1994, a fanzine at Kickers Offenbach was started and given the name 'Erwin' in Kostedde's honour. The fanzine lasted for 13 years and produced 65 editions.

References

External links
 
 
 

1946 births
Living people
Sportspeople from Münster
Association football forwards
German footballers
West German expatriate sportspeople in France
Germany international footballers
West German expatriate footballers
West German footballers
Bundesliga players
2. Bundesliga players
Ligue 1 players
Belgian Pro League players
SC Preußen Münster players
MSV Duisburg players
Standard Liège players
Kickers Offenbach players
Hertha BSC players
Borussia Dortmund players
SG Union Solingen players
Stade Lavallois players
SV Werder Bremen players
VfL Osnabrück players
Expatriate footballers in Belgium
Expatriate footballers in France
German people of American descent
German people of African-American descent
Footballers from North Rhine-Westphalia
West German expatriate sportspeople in Belgium